was a Japanese samurai of the Sengoku period, who served the Uesugi clan of Echigo Province. He was one of Uesugi Kenshin's leading generals. His ferocity in combat gave rise to his nickname, .

He was also sometimes called "The Ogre" because his helmet had an image of a grinning oni, a mythical creature which has been translated as ogre or demon. His weapon was a kanabō, a weapon associated with ogres, and thus adding further to his reputation.

References

1522 births
1582 deaths
Uesugi retainers
Samurai